Mamoru Kobayashi ( Kobayashi Mamoru; 26 October 1944 – 17 January 2023) was a Japanese politician. A member of the Japan Socialist Party, he served in the House of Representatives from 1990 to 2003.

Kobayashi died in Kanuma on 17 January 2023, at the age of 78.

References

1944 births
2023 deaths
Social Democratic Party (Japan) politicians
Members of the House of Representatives (Japan)
20th-century Japanese politicians
21st-century Japanese politicians
People from Kanuma, Tochigi